The National Advisory Council (NAC) of India was a body set up by the first United Progressive Alliance (UPA) government to advise the Prime Minister of India Manmohan Singh. Sonia Gandhi served as its chairperson for much of the tenure of the UPA. It's aim was to assist the Prime Minister in achieving and monitoring missions and goals.

History
The NAC was set up on 4 June 2004 by prime minister Manmohan Singh, during the tenure of the first UPA government.

Organization (2010–2014)
The NAC - II consisted of a mix of activists, bureaucrats, economists, politicians and industrialists-
 Sonia Gandhi - chairperson.
 Mihir Shah - Member, Planning Commission.
 Narendra Jadhav - former bureaucrat & Member, Planning Commission.
 Ashis Mondal - Director of Action for Social Advancement (ASA), Bhopal.
 Prof. Pramod Tandon - Vice Chancellor, North Eastern Hill University.
 Deep Joshi - social activist.
 Farah Naqvi - social activist.
 Dr. N. C. Saxena - former bureaucrat.
 Anu Aga - businessperson.
 A. K. Shiva Kumar - economist.
 Mirai Chatterjee - Coordinator, SEWA, Ahmedabad.

The members who served on the NAC and later resigned are 
 Aruna Roy - former bureaucrat.
 Prof. M.S. Swaminathan - agricultural scientist and MP.
 Dr. Ram Dayal Munda - MP.
 Jean Dreze - development economist.
 Harsh Mander - author, columnist, researcher, teacher, and social activist.
 Madhav Gadgil - ecologist.
 Jayaprakash Narayan (Lok Satta)- former bureaucrat.

Achievements
The NAC was responsible for the drafting of several key bills passed by both UPA governments, including the Right to Information Act, Right to Education Act, MNREGA, and the Food Security Bill.

Criticisms 
The concept of a NAC has been criticised by opposition parties and some scholars as not being in keeping with India's constitution, because of the possibility that it might emerge as an alternative cabinet. However an alternative view was that the existence of the NAC could kill the thread of democracy by facilitating greater pre-legislative/pre-policy consultation. The NAC also finalised draft recommendations for a mandatory pre-legislative consultative process which led to believe that constituted members of parliament are less important than some biased bureaucrats. which will literally kill the idea of democracy. It was heavily criticised for drafting the communal violence bill in 2011. The NAC was also accused of exercising all the prime ministerial powers rather than letting Manmohan Singh to exercising them. The council ceased to exist when the BJP government took office after the 2014 Indian general elections.

References

External links
Editorial in the Times of India on NAC.
statement by George Fernandez, leader of the opposition on the formation of NAC.

Councils of India
Members of National Advisory Council, India
Advisory
Defunct government departments and agencies of India
2014 disestablishments in India
2004 establishments in Delhi